Jamia Millia Islamia is a central university located in New Delhi, India. Originally established at Aligarh, United Provinces (present-day Uttar Pradesh, India) during the British Raj in 1920, it moved to its current location in Okhla in 1935. It was given the deemed status by University Grants Commission in 1962. On 26 December 1988, it became a central university.

The foundation committee of the university included Abdul Bari Firangi Mahali, Hussain Ahmad Madani, Muhammad Iqbal, Sanaullah Amritsari, Syed Mehmood and others. Its foundation stone was laid by Mahmud Hasan Deobandi, the leader of Silk Letter Movement and the first student of Darul Uloom Deoband. Muhammad Ali Jauhar served as its first vice-chancellor from 1920 to 1923, and Hakim Ajmal Khan served as the first chancellor from 1920 to 1927. On 26 May 2017, Najma Heptulla became 11th Chancellor of the university, and Najma Akhtar became the 15th Vice Chancellor in April 2019. On 13th March 2023, Mufaddal Saifuddin was elected the 12th Chancellor of the university, replacing Najma Heptulla.

In 2020, Jamia Millia Islamia was ranked 1st among all central universities in the country in rankings released by Ministry of Education of India. In December 2021, the university received an 'A++' ranking by National Assessment and Accreditation Council.

History

Jamia Millia Islamia was established in Aligarh on 29 October 1920 by Mohammad Ali Jauhar, Hakim Ajmal Khan, Mukhtar Ahmed Ansari, Abdul Majeed Khwaja, and Zakir Hussain under the presidency of Mahmud Hasan Deobandi. It was established mainly in response to the demand of some students of the Aligarh Muslim University for a new National Muslim University which would be free from government influence as they felt that the administration of Aligarh Muslim University was of pro-British stance.

It was conceived as a national institution that would offer progressive education and an emphasis on Indian nationalism to students from all communities, particularly Muslims. Zakir Hussain described "the movement of Jamia Millia Islamia as a struggle for education and cultural renaissance that aims to prepare a blueprint for Indian Muslims which may focus on Islam but simultaneously evolve a national culture for common Indian. It will lay the foundation of the thinking that true religious education will promote patriotism and national integration among Indian Muslims, who will be proud to take part in the future progress of India, which will play its part in the comity of nations for peace and development. The objective of establishment of Jamia Millia Islamia will be to lay down the common curriculum for Indian Muslims taking into account the future challenges and will prepare the children to be masters of future" The emergence of Jamia was supported by Mahatma Gandhi, who felt that Jamia Millia Islamia could shape lives of hundreds and thousands of students on the basis of a shared culture and worldview.

In 1925, Jamia Millia Islamia moved from Aligarh to Karol Bagh, New Delhi. On 1 March 1935, the foundation stone for a school building was laid at Okhla, then a nondescript village in the southern outskirts of Delhi. In 1936, all institutions of Jamia Millia Islamia except Jamia Press, the Maktaba, and the library moved to the new campus.

The University Grants Commission gave Jamia Millia Islamia the deemed status in 1962. Jamia Millia Islamia became a central university by an act of the Indian Parliament on 26 December 1988.

In 2006, the King of Saudi Arabia, King Abdullah of Saudi Arabia paid a visit to the university and donated US$2.90 million for the construction of a library, now known as Dr. Zakir Husain Library (Central Library).

In 2019, the university emerged as a centre of the Citizenship Amendment Act protests after the act was passed by the Parliament. On 13 December 2019, Delhi Police tried to forcefully dismiss the protest of students and threw tear gas inside the campus on students to control their agitation. On 15 December 2019, police entered the campus on the pretext of trying to catch the mob that destroyed public peace outside the university campus. Many students sustained injuries because of the police brutality and it sparked protests in several other universities.

Founders
 Mahmud Hasan Deobandi: He laid the foundation stone of Jamia Millia Islamia and was the most aged among all the founders of Jamia. He was president of the opening ceremony of Jamia Millia Islamia at Aligarh, which took place on 29 October 1920. His presidential speech was read by his student Shabbir Ahmad Usmani.
 Abul Kalam Azad, the nationalist leader of the Indian National Congress, was one of its main initial patrons.
 Mohammad Ali Jouhar became Jamia's first Vice Chancellor.
Mahatma Gandhi, the leader of Independence Movement and the Father of the Nation, Gandhi was one of the key people in the foundation of Jamia.
 Zakir Hussain took over the university in its turbulent times in 1927 and guided it through the difficulties. After his death, he was buried on the campus of the university where his mausoleum is open to the public.
 Mukhtar Ahmed Ansari later became the vice chancellor. The main auditorium and Health Centre of the university are both named after him.
 Abdul Majeed Khwaja
 Abid Hussain (not to be confused with Abid Hussain)
 Hakim Ajmal Khan: On 22 November 1920, Hakim Ajmal Khan was elected the first chancellor of Jamia.
 Mohammad Mujeeb, under whose leadership Jamia Millia Islamia became a Deemed University on 9 June 1962.

The foundation committee of the Jamia Millia Islamia also included Kifayatullah Dehlawi, Hussain Ahmad Madani, Syed Sulaiman Nadwi, Abdul Haq, Abdul Bari Firangi Mahali, Shabbir Ahmad Usmani, Sanaullah Amritsari, Muhammad Iqbal, Syed Mahmud and Saifuddin Kitchlew in it.

Campus
The campus is distributed over a large area in the Okhla area of Delhi. Many of its buildings are under renovation. 
The university's scenic cricket ground, Nawab Mansoor Ali Khan Pataudi Sports Complex, has hosted many important Tournaments and Indian women cricket matches. This ground also hosted the University Cricket Championship in 2013 Besides its seven faculties, the Jamia has centres of learning and research, including the Anwar Jamal Kidwai Mass Communication Research Centre (MCRC), Faculty of Engineering & Technology, Faculty of Fine Arts, Centre for Theoretical Physics, the Maulana Mohammad Ali Jauhar Academy of Third World Studies (ATWS) and a mosque. The Jamia offers undergraduate and postgraduate information and technology courses. Jamia Millia Islamia joined the green campaign and installed 2,250-kilowatt solar panels on the campus.

Sports 

Jamia lays immense stress on holistic development of the students and staff by providing various sporting activities. Jamia has created and maintained excellent sports facilities and extensive infrastructure for holding cultural events and other co-curricular activities.  Initially, the University got recognition in sports when Jamia won its first Gold and Silver Medal in Wrestling in 1977 at the All India Inter University Championship.

Ranji Trophy and Vijaya Trophy matches are a regular event every year at the Jamia Cricket ground.  In the past, Jamia has hosted Women's Cricket Test matches, Women’s World Cup matches and Blind’s Cricket World Cup matches. The facilities were used as practice ground for Commonwealth Games as well.  

The ground within its periphery now also consists of Centrally Air-Conditioned Indoor Games Stadium. The sports complex has facilities for: Cricket, Football, Lawn Tennis Court, Volleyball Court, Badminton, Basketball, Jogging Track, Athletics, Table Tennis , Yoga, Snooker Room and Hockey. The Complex is equipped with latest Gymnasium and sports equipment. The admissions under sports category following games are Athletics, Boxing, Badminton, Basketball, Cricket, Football, Hockey, Shooting (Air Rifle, Air Pistol and Shot Gun), Table Tennis, Lawn Tennis, Volleyball and Wrestling

Library

The University Library System, consisting of a centralized and departmental libraries and archives, have over 6.0 lakhs and about 1.43 lakhs subject-specific books, best Urdu book collections; 5000 rare books; 2230 rare manuscripts. Besides print section, Library extensively subscribes to open access to videos; e-resources; ebooks; e-journals; other academic materials; databases for Sciences, Social Sciences, Arts-Humanities, Engineering; Law; few select databases are subscribed by University through e-Sodhganga; MOOCS courses; member of NAD. Provision of remote access to databases; and antiplagiarism software. Digital Resource Centre has 100 workstations as a gateway for online resources; 200 computers for students. The library is open to all bonafide students of Jamia Millia Islamia. Besides this, there are subject collection in libraries of some faculties and centres.

Organisation and administration

Governance
The governing officials of the university include the Amir-i-Jamia (chancellor), the Shaikh-ul-Jamia (vice-chancellor), the Naib Shaikh-ul-Jamia (Pro-Vice-Chancellor) and the Musajjil (Registrar). The President of India is the Visitor of the university. The Anjuman or University Court is the supreme authority of the university and has the power to review the acts of the Majlis-i-Muntazimah (Executive Council) the Majlis-i-Talimi  (Academic Council) and the Majlis-i-Maliyat (Finance Committee). The Executive Council is the highest executive body of the university. The Academic Council is the highest academic body of the university and is responsible for the maintenance of standards of instruction, education and examination within the university.

In 2017 Najma Heptulla was appointed as the Chancellor of Jamia Millia Islamia.
In 2019 Najma Akhtar (academic) was appointed as the first woman vice-chancellor of Jamia Millia Islamia. After which in 2023, Syedna Mufaddal Saifuddin succeeded her and was appointed as the Chancellor of Jamia Millia Islamia.

Faculties
Jamia Millia Islamia has ten faculties under which it offers academic and extension programs.

Faculty of Law

Established in 1989, the Faculty of Law offered only the three-year LL.B.course until the early 2000s, but started additionally offering the integrated 5 Years B.A.LL.B(Hons.) course for UG students from the academic year 2002–2003. The faculty offers apart from a five-year integrated BA LLB (Honours) programme, a two-year post-graduate programme (LLM) in three specialised streams (personal law, corporate law and criminal law) and a Ph.D. programme. It also offers two year Executive LL.M programme for working professionals. The faculty secured the 9th rank among law schools in India as per NIRF LAW Ranking 2020. The courses taught at the faculty include LL. M, Personal Law, Corporate Law, Criminal Law, B.A.LL.B (Hons), P.G. Diploma, Labour Law and Air and Space Law.

Faculty of Engineering and Technology

The Faculty of Engineering and Technology (FET) was established in 1985. Its has several departments offering programmes in PhD, M.Tech, M.Sc, B.Tech and B.Sc including Civil Engineering, Mechanical Engineering, Electrical Engineering, Electronics & Communication Engineering, Computer Engineering, Aeronautics, Applied Sciences & Humanities and Environmental Science.  They also provide specialization courses for Master Degrees such as Environmental Science and Engineering, Earthquake Engineering, Machine Design, Thermal Engineering, Production and Industrial Engineering, Electrical Power Management System, Control & Instrumental System, Electronics, Energy Science and Management, Energy Science and Technology. The faculty offers regular courses and continuing programmes. In the Times Higher Education Subject Ranking-2020, JMI ranked 401–500 in Engineering and Technology. Within India its rank is 11 among all higher education institutions while among universities it is 2nd position. JMI was placed at 501–600 in computer science, while among Indian Institutions it has been ranked at 16th position and at 7th among Indian universities.

Faculty of Architecture and Ekistics
Jamia Millia Islamia is the only Central university having the full-fledged Faculty of Architecture & Ekistics.The architecture program was started in the Year 2001–2002. This Faculty has the Department of Architecture which offers two degree courses in Bachelor of Architecture, Nine Masters courses and PhD. The courses include undergraduate, postgraduate and doctoral studies in subjects such as Architecture, Architecture Pedagogy, Health Architecture, Building Services, Urban Regeneration, Ekistics, Master of Planning (M.Plan) and Master of Design (M.Des)

Faculty of Humanities and Languages

This Faculty has ten departments offering programmes in PhD, M Phil (pre-PhD), Postgraduate, Undergraduate, Diploma and Certificate courses.

The faculty has departments include the departments for Arabic, English, Hindi, History and Culture, Islamic Studies, Persian, Iranology, Urdu, Sanskrit and Foreign Languages such as Korean, Turkish, French and Spanish. Also provide certificate programme like Chinese, Uzbek, Portuguese, Russian, Kazakh, Italian etc. Islamic studies has been a subject at Jamia Millia Islamia since its inception. It was instituted as a separate department in 1988. The department has been headed by scholars like Zayn al-Abidin Sajjad Meerthi. The department publishes an annual magazine, Sada e Jauhar.

Faculty of Fine Arts
This Faculty has six departments offering programmes in PhD, Master of Fine Arts (MFA), Bachelor of Fine Arts (BFA), diploma and certificate courses. The subjects taught include Painting, Sculpture, Applied Arts, Art Education, Graphic Art and Art History & Art Appreciation. The campus has an art gallery named after the Indian painter M. F. Hussain.

Faculty of Social Sciences and Commerce & Business Management

This varsity's Faculty of Social Sciences and Commerce & Business Management consists of nine departments. These include the departments for Social Sciences, Psychology, Economics, Political Science, Sociology, Social Work, Commerce & Business Studies and the Library and Information Science.

The College of Social Science is based around Gulistan-e-Ghalib and is commonly referred to as the Main Campus.

Faculty of Natural Sciences
The faculty of Natural Sciences consists of eight departments in which including Natural Sciences, Physics, Chemistry, Mathematics, Geography, Biosciences, Computer Science, Biotechnology are taught. In addition, there are four associated centres namely the Centre for Theoretical Physics, Centre for Interdisciplinary Research in Basic Sciences, Centre for Nanoscience and Nanotechnology and the Multidisciplinary Centre Advanced Research in Science.

Faculty of Education
This Faculty specializes in quality training and education to budding teachers through two departments namely Educational Studies and Institute of Advanced Studies in Education, formerly known as the department of Teacher Training and Non-Formal Education.

Faculty of Dentistry
This faculty offering B. D. S. Programmes

Faculty of Management Studies
This faculty consists of three department namely Management Studies, Hospital Management & Hospice Studies and Tourism & Hospitality Management.

Centers

AJK Mass Communication Research Center

The Mass Communication Research Centre was established in 1982 by Anwar Jamal Kidwai, then vice-chancellor (later chancellor) of Jamia Millia Islamia. The centers offers postgraduate courses in Mass Communication. FTK-Centre for Information Technology An internet facility is available for the faculty members, staff, research scholars, and students.

The centre offers courses including Master of Arts(M.A.) courses in Mass Communication, Convergent Journalism, Development Communication, Visual Effect and Animation as well as postgraduate diplomas in, Still Photography and Visual Communication, Acting and Broadcast Technology.

Centre for Physiotherapy and Rehabilitation Sciences
The centre offers courses including , (B.P.T) Bachelor of Physiotherapy , M.P.T. (Sports), M.P.T. (Orthopaedics), M.P.T. (Neurology), M.P.T. (Cardiopulmonary) and the doctorate in philosophy.

Centre for Nanoscience and Nanotechnology
The mission of the Centre for Nanoscience and Nanotechnology (CNN) is to promote forefront basic and applied research in the fields of nanoscience and nanotechnology, with potential applications towards fulfilling national strategic needs. The main research focus of the centre includes nano-fabrication and nano-device, nano-materials and nano-structures, nano-biotechnology and nano-medicine, nano-structure characterization and measurements.
PhD
M.Tech (Nanotechnology)

Centre for European and Latin American Studies
The Centre for European and Latin American Studies (CELAS) offers Certificate, Diploma and Advanced Diploma in five languages viz. 
French
Spanish
Italian
Portuguese
Russian. 
All the language courses offered at CELAS are part-time courses. Apart from the above-mentioned courses, CELAS also offers M.Phil/PhD in European Studies/ Latin American Studies. Occasionally, professors from different countries come and teach the above-mentioned languages.

MMAJ Academy of International Studies 

Formerly Academy of Third World Studies, MMAJ Academy of International Studies was established in 1988 under the initiative of the then Prime Minister Rajiv Gandhi to conduct inter-disciplinary research on social, political and economic issues pertaining to the developing countries. Subsequently, it was renamed after one of the co-founders of Jamia Millia Islamia, Maulana Mohamad Ali Jauhar. 

The academy offers M.Phil. and Ph.D. programmes in International Studies, postgraduate courses (Politics: International and Area Studies) and 
language courses in Uzbek and Chinese. It also has its own library and documentation centre, named after Dr. Abid Husain, another founder of Jamia Millia Islamia.

Centre for Culture Media & Governance
CCMG pursues an interdisciplinary commitment given the pivotal role of communication in the organization of institutional forms, symbolic system and pattern of everyday life.
CCMG seeks to foster a renewed relationship between media and governance that will benefit society at large. The centre offers M.A. and Ph.D. Programs.

Other centers
Dr. Zakir Husain Institute of Islamic Studies
FTK-Centre for Information Technology
Centre for Distance and Open Learning
Deen Dayal Upadhyaya Kaushal Kendra
Nelson Mandela Centre for Peace and Conflict Resolution
Centre for Jawaharlal Nehru Studies
Centre for Comparative Religions and Civilizations
Centre for West Asian Studies
Dr. K.R. Narayanan Centre for Dalit and Minorities Studies
Academy of Professional Development of Urdu Medium Teachers
Centre for North East Studies and Policy Research
Centre for Theoretical Physics
India - Arab Cultural Centre
Centre for Culture Media & Governance
Centre for Interdisciplinary Research in Basic Sciences
Centre for the Study of Social Exclusion and Inclusive Policy 
Central Instrumentation Facility
UGC-Human Resource Development Centre
Centre for Coaching and Career Planning
Jamia's Premchand Archives & Literary Centre
Sarojini Naidu Centre for Women's Studies
University Counseling & Guidance Centre
Centre for Early Childhood Development and Research
Centre for Innovation and Entrepreneurship (CIE)
Multidisciplinary Centre for Advanced Research and Studies

Schools
Jamia Millia Islamia also imparts education from nursery to senior secondary level.
Balak Mata Centres
Gerda Philipsborn Day Care Centre
Mushir Fatma Jamia Nursery School
Jamia Middle School
Jamia Senior Secondary School 	
Syed Abid Husain Senior Secondary School
Jamia Girls Senior Secondary School

Mosques
The varsity has got certain mosques in the campus including the Central Mosque. The central mosque is located opposite to the central library and has a capacity of over 1000 people. This mosque is situated on Maulana Mohammad Ali Jauhar Marg Delhi.

Rankings 

Internationally, Jamia Millia Islamia was ranked 801–1000 in the QS World University Rankings of 2023 and 188 in Asia. It was ranked 501–600 in the world by the London based Times Higher Education World University Rankings of 2023, 160 in Asia in 2022 and 172 among emerging economies. Jamia Millia Islamia has been ranked 438 out of 1100 universities worldwide by Moscow based Round University Ranking. 

Jamia Millia Islamia (JMI) has secured the first position among all the central universities in the country in the ranking that was released by the Ministry of Education with a score of 90 per cent. It was ranked 13th in India overall by the National Institutional Ranking Framework (NIRF) in 2022, 3rd among universities, 12th in law ranking, 9th in architecture ranking, 16th in the dental ranking, 26th in the engineering ranking, 19th in Research institutes and 29th in the management ranking.

The Faculty of Law was ranked 6 among government law schools in India by Outlook India in 2022.

Notable alumni and faculties

Since its inception, Jamia Millia Islamia has produced notable alumni. Notable alumni in Bollywood include Shah Rukh Khan, Mouni Roy; in journalism include Arfa Khanum Sherwani, Barkha Dutt, Anjana Om Kashyap; in politics include Ampareen Lyngdoh, Kunwar Danish Ali; in Cricket include Virendar Sehwag. It has also produced notable scholars including Moulana Imran Raza Ansari and Mohammad Najeeb Qasmi.

See also
 Jamia Hamdard
 Distance Education Council
 Education in Delhi
 Education in India
 List of universities in India
 Universities and colleges in India

References

External links

 

 

 
New Delhi
Central universities in India
Islamic universities and colleges in India
Educational institutions established in 1920
1920 establishments in British India
Mahmud Hasan Deobandi